Bjarki Már Elísson (born 16 May 1990) is an Icelandic handball player for Telekom Veszprém and the Icelandic national handball team.

He participated at the 2017 World Men's Handball Championship.

References

External links

Elisson, Bjarki Mar
Elisson, Bjarki Mar
Sportspeople from Reykjavík
Icelandic male handball players
Expatriate handball players
Icelandic expatriate sportspeople in Germany
Icelandic expatriate sportspeople in Hungary
Handball-Bundesliga players
Füchse Berlin Reinickendorf HBC players
UMF Selfoss handball players
Veszprém KC players